Ray Clark is an American former Negro league pitcher who played in the 1930s.

Clark played for the Newark Dodgers in 1934 and 1935. In five recorded appearances on the mound, he posted a 9.86 ERA over 21 innings.

References

External links
 and Seamheads

Year of birth missing
Place of birth missing
Newark Dodgers players